Homeobox protein Hox-A5 is a protein that in humans is encoded by the HOXA5 gene.

Function 

In vertebrates, the genes encoding the class of transcription factors called homeobox genes are found in clusters named A, B, C, and D on four separate chromosomes. Expression of these proteins is spatially and temporally regulated during embryonic development. This gene is part of the A cluster on chromosome 7 and encodes a DNA-binding transcription factor which may regulate gene expression, morphogenesis, and differentiation. Methylation of this gene may result in the loss of its expression and, since the encoded protein upregulates the tumor suppressor p53, this protein may play an important role in tumorigenesis.

HoxA5 is controlled, at least in part, by DNA methylation. HoxA5 has been shown to upregulate the tumor suppressor p53 and AKT1 by downregulation of PTEN. Suppression of HoxA5 has been shown to attenuate hemangioma growth. HoxA5 has far-reaching effects on gene expression, causing ~300 genes to become upregulated upon its induction in breast cancer cell lines.  HoxA5 protein transduction domain overexpression prevents inflammation shown by inhibition of TNFα-inducible monocyte binding to HUVECs.

Comparison of the HoxA5 promoter methylation profile across cell types from the least differentiated (human embryonic stem cells) to the most endothelial-like (human umbilical vein endothelial cells, or HUVECs) shows that the HoxA5 promoter is normally heavily methylated in non-differentiated cells and becomes demethylated as cells differentiate down the endothelial lineage. HoxA5 contains a C-Amp Response Elements (CRE) in its promoter.  POL2 and CTCF binding are enriched at the CpG-dense HoxA5 promoter in HUVECs, demonstrating transcriptional activity.

Clinical significance 

HoxA5 is suppressed in acute myeloid leukemia (AML), and the DNMT inhibitor decitabine (5Aza) is used to treat this disease. While HoxA5 is known to be hypermethylated in AML, it has not yet been shown whether decitabine directly targets these genes for demethylation.

See also 
 Homeobox

References

External links 
 

Transcription factors